The United States Senate election of 1958 in New York was held on November 4, 1958. Incumbent Republican Senator Irving Ives retired. Republican Representative Kenneth Keating defeated Democrat Frank Hogan to succeed Ives. As of 2023, this is the last time the Republicans won the Class 1 Senate seat in New York.

Democratic convention

Candidates

Declared
 Thomas K. Finletter, former Secretary of the Air Force
 Frank Hogan, District Attorney of New York County
 Thomas E. Murray Sr., former Atomic Energy Commissioner

Results
The Democratic convention was held on August 26.

Candidates

Democratic
 Frank Hogan, District Attorney of New York County

Republican
 Kenneth Keating, U.S. Representative

Independents and third parties

Independent Socialist
 Corliss Lamont, Chairman of National Council of American-Soviet Friendship

Liberal
The Liberal Party initially chose Thomas K. Finletter as its nominee for Senate, but after Finletter lost the Democratic nomination to Frank Hogan, Finletter withdrew and the party endorsed Hogan instead.

General election

Results

References

1958
New York
United States Senate